Locust Star is a split EP between Oakland bands Neurosis and Tribes of Neurot released in 1996 through Relapse Records as a CD and a promo. Unlike most split releases, both groups involved with this EP are composed of the same members.

Content
Being a side project of Neurosis, Tribes of Neurot creates ambient releases that act as companion pieces to Neurosis albums meant to be played simultaneously. In 1995, Tribes of Neurot released Silver Blood Transmission, and in 1996, Neurosis released Through Silver in Blood. Locust Star acts as a sort of bridge between the two, featuring songs from both.

The song
"Locust Star" is a track originally from Through Silver in Blood. This split includes a shortened edit of the song that was distributed to radio stations as a promotional. Musically, "Locust Star" is an aggressive post-metal song that has since been recognized as one of Neurosis's signature tracks.

A music video for "Locust Star" directed by Neurosis and Andrei Rozen was released in 1996. The video depicts a weary man wandering through a wasteland, assaulted by visions.

The EP

Locust Star is composed of four tracks from Through Silver in Blood, three of which are new shortened edits, and three tracks by Tribes of Neurot, one of which appeared on their 1995 album Silver Blood Transmission. The closing songs, "Sustenance" and "Crawl Inside", are unique to this release.

Track listing

Personnel
Neurosis
 Scott Kelly – guitar, vocals, percussion
 Steve Von Till – guitar, vocals, percussion
 Noah Landis – keyboards, synthesizer, sampling
 Dave Edwardson – bass guitar, backing vocals
 Jason Roeder – drums, percussion
 Pete Inc. – visuals

Tribes of Neurot
 Dave Edwardson – percussion, bass, effects, programming
 Noah Landis – sampling, tapes
 Steve Von Till – synthesizers, electronics, noises, effects, tapes, drums, samplers, bass, timpani

References

Split albums
Tribes of Neurot albums
Neurosis (band) albums
1996 albums